Beluga Point Site (49ANC-054) is an archaeological location along Turnagain Arm of Cook Inlet, near Seward Highway Milepost 110, south of Anchorage, in the U.S. state of Alaska. It was added to the National Register of Historic Places on March 30, 1978.

Artifacts of the area are evidence of early human habitation. Beluga Point North 1 (BPN1) artifacts are 8,000–10,000 years old and believed to be evidence of the oldest habitation in Anchorage municipality . Various other artifacts at Beluga Point South 1 and 2 (BPS1 and BPS2) are believed to be 3,500 to 4,000 years old, while some newer ones are dated at 600 to 800 years old.

Beluga Point is also a wildlife viewing area under the jurisdiction of the Alaska Department of Fish and Game. Beluga whales  can be sighted seasonly July through August as hundreds of the cetaceans visit Cook Inlet to feed on the Pacific salmon run.

See also
National Register of Historic Places listings in Anchorage, Alaska

References

Archaeological sites on the National Register of Historic Places in Alaska
Geography of Anchorage, Alaska
History of indigenous peoples of North America
Native American history of Alaska
Tourist attractions in Anchorage, Alaska
National Register of Historic Places in Anchorage, Alaska